The KW postcode area, or Kirkwall postcode area, is a group of sixteen postcode districts in the far north of Scotland, within fifteen post towns. These cover Caithness (including Wick, Thurso, Halkirk, Berriedale, Dunbeath, Latheron and Lybster), east Sutherland (including Golspie, Brora, Helmsdale, Kinbrace and Forsinard) and the Orkney Islands.



Coverage
The approximate coverage of the postcode districts:

|-
! KW1
| WICK
| John O'Groats, Keiss
| Highland
|-
! KW2
| LYBSTER
| Caithness
| Highland
|-
! KW3
| LYBSTER
| Caithness
| Highland
|-
! KW5
| LATHERON
| Caithness
| Highland
|-
! KW6
| DUNBEATH
| Caithness
| Highland
|-
! KW7
| BERRIEDALE
| Caithness
| Highland
|-
! KW8
| HELMSDALE
| Sutherland
| Highland
|-
! KW9
| BRORA
| Sutherland
| Highland
|-
! KW10
| GOLSPIE
| Sutherland
| Highland
|-
! KW11
| KINBRACE
| Sutherland
| Highland
|-
! KW12
| HALKIRK
| Caithness
| Highland
|-
! KW13
| FORSINARD
| Sutherland
| Highland
|-
! KW14
| THURSO
| Caithness
| Highland
|-
! KW15
| KIRKWALL
| Kirkwall, St Ola
| Orkney Islands
|-
! KW16
| STROMNESS
| Stromness, Hoy, Flotta, Graemsay, Sandwick, Stenness
| Orkney Islands
|-
! KW17
| ORKNEY
| Most of Mainland, all of the north isles, Burray, South Ronaldsay
| Orkney Islands
|}

Map

See also
Postcode Address File
List of postcode areas in the United Kingdom

References

External links
Royal Mail's Postcode Address File
A quick introduction to Royal Mail's Postcode Address File (PAF)

Postcode areas covering Scotland
Brora